Arnold Bertram Quick (10 February 1915 – 17 July 1990) was an English cricketer who played first-class cricket from 1936 to 1952.

An exuberant, hard-hitting right-handed batsman, noted for the power of his driving, Arnold Quick played 19 matches for Essex. He played most of his first-class cricket before the Second World War, making only two appearances afterwards, in 1948 for the Marylebone Cricket Club and in 1952 for Essex. Quick made 439 runs in his career, at a batting average of 13.71 runs per innings. His best score of 57 was one of two half-centuries. He also played over forty Second XI matches for Essex, captaining the team from 1956 to 1959.

References

External links
 
 

1915 births
1990 deaths
People from Clacton-on-Sea
Essex cricketers
Marylebone Cricket Club cricketers
English cricketers